Fort Worth Central Station is an intermodal transit center in downtown Fort Worth, Texas. It serves the TEXRail and Trinity Railway Express (TRE) commuter rail lines, Amtrak intercity rail, Greyhound Lines intercity bus and as the main transfer center for Trinity Metro buses. It is located at the corner of 9th and Jones Streets, on the east side of downtown Fort Worth. TRE service began on December 3, 2001, Amtrak service followed in 2002 and most recently TEXRail began service on January 10, 2019. It is the busiest Amtrak station in Texas, by ridership.

History
Fort Worth Central Station opened on December 12, 2001 as the Fort Worth Intermodal Transportation Center (ITC). The facility was constructed by Steele-Freeman, Inc. of Fort Worth, Texas.  The project manager for Steele-Freeman was Conan Mathson.  Prior to the ITC's opening, transit services operated independently without a unified hub in downtown Fort Worth: formerly the Trinity Metro bus lines converged at a transit mall along the one-way couplet corridor of Houston Street and Throckmorton Street, and the Amtrak and Greyhound Lines were served by the former Gulf, Colorado and Santa Fe Railroad Passenger Station.

Fort Worth Central Station is located north of two former railroad stations: the Santa Fe Freight Building, built in 1938, now serving as the University of Texas at Arlington's Fort Worth Education Center; and the 1889 Gulf, Colorado and Santa Fe Railroad Passenger Station which was renovated and renamed Fort Worth Union Depot which served as Fort Worth's Amtrak station from 1971 to 2002 (now a party/banquet facility called Ashton Depot following a recent restoration.) On March 25, 2019, the Trinity Metro board of directors unanimously voted to rename the ITC as Fort Worth Central Station.

Service
Amtrak: Texas Eagle, Heartland Flyer
Greyhound Lines 
TEXRail 
Trinity Metro
Trinity Railway Express

References

External links

TRE - Fort Worth ITC Station
Amtrak - Texas Eagle Stations - Fort Worth, TX

Fort Worth Amtrak Station (USA Rail Guide -- Train Web)
UTA Fort Worth Education Center

TEXRail stations
Railway stations in the United States opened in 2001
Trinity Railway Express stations
Economy of Fort Worth, Texas
Amtrak stations in Texas
Transit centers in the United States
Bus stations in Tarrant County, Texas
Transportation in Tarrant County, Texas
2001 establishments in Texas
Railway stations in Tarrant County, Texas
Railway stations in Fort Worth, Texas